Pauri is a town and a municipal board in Pauri Garhwal district in the Indian state of Uttarakhand. Pauri is the seat of the Divisional Commissioner of the Garhwal Division.

Geography
It is located 1,765 meters above sea level. Pauri provides a panoramic view of the snow-covered Himalayan peaks of Nanda Devi and Trisul, Gangotri Group, Thalaiya-Sagar, Nilkantha, Bandar Poonch, Swargarohini, Kedarnath, Kharcha Kund, Satopanth, Chaukhamba, Ghoriparvat, Haathi Parvat, Sumeru, etc. Pauri is the perfect vantage point to enjoy the breathtaking scenic view of the mountains regions of the great Himalayas. The errand across 9Kandoliya-Tekka stretch along evergreen deodar trees is worth walking. The town is visited by tourists, researchers, and students from across the world. The place is a paradise for trekkers, paragliding enthusiasts, and nature lovers.

Climate
The region has a sub-temperate to temperate climate, which remains pleasant throughout the year. The climate of Pauri is very cold in winters and the region experiences low to moderate snowfall in the months of January or February. The climate is soothing in summer when flowers bloom in the nearby forests and tourists flock to town. In rainy season the climate is very cool and lush greenery covers the town.

Demographics
According to the Census India 2011 the Pauri Nagar Palika Parishad has population of 25,440 of which 13,090 are males while 12,350 are females. Population of Children with age of 0-6 is 2766 which is 10.87% of total population of Pauri (NPP). In Pauri Nagar Palika Parishad, Female Sex Ratio is of 943 against state average of 963. Moreover, Child Sex Ratio in Pauri is around 877 compared to Uttarakhand state average of 890. Literacy rate of Pauri city is 92.18% higher than state average of 78.82%. In Pauri, Male literacy is around 95.74% while female literacy rate is 88.44%. Pauri Nagar Palika Parishad has total administration over 6,127 houses to which it supplies basic amenities like water and sewerage.

 India census, 
Pauri had a population of 24,742. Males constitute 53% of the population and females 47%. In Pauri, 12% of the population is under 6 years of age.

The language most commonly used in Pauri Garhwal is Garhwali.

Education

Kendriya Vidyalaya
This is one of the most premier institutions of the town providing English medium education up to 12th class under CBSE board. Currently, it is being run from a temporary campus in Kandoliya but a permanent building is all set in Siroli village which is 8 km from the town.

Govind Ballabh Pant Engineering College
Govind Ballabh Pant Engineering College (GBPEC), now known as Govind Ballabh Pant Institute of Engineering and Technology (GBPIET), is an autonomous State Government Higher Technical Institution. It was created in 1989 to honour the great Indian Freedom Fighter, Bharat Ratna, Govind Ballabh Pant. The institute is located in serenity and purity of the Garhwal Himalayas, at a height of 1800m (approx 5905 ft.) above Sea Level and overlooks the Great Himalayan Range on its East flank. The college offers courses like Bachelor of Technology, Master of Technology and Master of Computer Applications. The college offers Mechanical Engineering, Electronics & Communication Engineering, Electrical Engineering, Computer Science & Engineering, Civil Engineering, Production Engineering and Biotechnology (from 2010).

Hemwati Nandan Bahuguna Central University
Dr. B. G. R Campus, referred to as the Pauri campus of Hemwati Nandan Bahuguna Garhwal University is a full-fledged educational campus established in 1971. Pauri College is one of the three campuses of Hemwati Nandan Bahuguna Garhwal University, located in Srinagar, Garhwal. The campus offers arts, science and law courses at graduation, post graduation and research fellowships levels. Located amidst the thick forest cover, the college offers a perfect educational environment to its students.

St. Thomas School
St. Thomas School is a premier educational institution in the town, established in 1973. The school comes under the Bijnor Diocese, headed by Rev. John Vadakle. It offers education in Science up to class 12th. It is an English medium school affiliated with ICSE board. This co-educational school has the record of offering 100% pass result in its last 40 years history.

Messmore Inter College
Established in the British era, Messmore Inter College or MIC is one of the oldest schools in the Garhwal region. The school was established in 1865 and offers education in science and arts up to class 12th. This is a Hindi medium, government aided school. The school is affiliated with Uttarakhand Board and is co-educational. This college belongs to the association of Methodist churches in India.

DAV Inter College
This is a Hindi medium, government aided school. The school is affiliated with Uttarakhand Board and offers co-education.

Sri Guru Ram Rai Public School
Sri Guru Ram Rai Public School was established by SGRR education mission in the heart of the city with easy accessibility from different corner of the city. School has a magnificent school building equipped with modern amenities. It has a team of highly qualified, motivated and hardworking teachers. 
The school is running classes from I to XII and is offering streams science, commerce and humanities for classes XI and XII. It is to proclaim that the school is the only school in the town to offer new subject Biotechnology as an elective subject for classes XI and XII.
Shri Guru Ram Rai Public School Pauri Garhwal has achieved high water mark by distinguished performance of the students in the field of academics, extra curricular activities, sports, finearts and in many other inter school competitions.

Government Inter College (GIC)
This is a Hindi medium, government aided school. The school is affiliated with Uttarakhand Board.

Girls Government Inter College (GGIC)
This is a Hindi medium, government aided school. The school is affiliated with Uttarakhand Board.

Places of interest
 Kandoliya Mandir-Kandoliya devta is the local deity, referred in the local language as the bhumi devta. The temple has been in the area for years, amidst thick pine forest. In the region, it is a custom to begin every auspicious work with the blessings of Kandoliya thakur. Every year, a bhandara (feast) is held in the month of May–June in the temple. It is attended by lakhs of devotees.
 Nag Dev Mandir-Nag Dev is a small temple located in the Pine and Rhododendron forest region. The temple belongs to the nag devta (the snake god). Located away, from the hustles and bustles of town, the place offers solace to the tired soul. 
 Kyunkaleshwar Temple-This is an 8th-Century-old, Shiv temple believed to be raised by Adi Shankracharya. The presiding deity of the temple are Shiva, his wife Parvati and sons, Ganesha and Kartikeyan. The temple in itself is a historic shrine and visited by thousands of Shaivaites. Kyunkaleshwar temple is known for the artistic stone work done in the temple premises. The temple also has a Sanskrit Vidyalaya and Gurukul where young children come to learn Veds and Purans.
 Laxmi Narayan Temple-Located on the main Laxmi-Narayan Temple Road in the main city and is visited by locals round the day. The temple is named after Lord Laxmi Narayan or Vishnu. It also houses a Shiv temple, Hanuman temple, Durga temple, Ganesha Temple.
 Hanuman Mandir-The Hanuman Mandir in Pauri is located in the Deodar Forest. It is located around 2 km from the main city.
 Methodist Church, Chopra-The church is over 100 years old and is located in the lower chopra region of the town. The church is located a stone throw away distance from MIC Pauri.
 Methodist Church, Gadoli-The church belongs to the Methodist community based in Gadoli region.
 Dhara Road-A flourishing market area in the city, having small and big shops selling a variety of things. 
 Khirsu-Located 15 km away from the Pauri city, this small, tourist village has apple orchards and huge gardens which remains filled with flowers and fruits in Spring. The region is known its views of the Himalayas. The Garhwal Mandal Vikas Nigam (GMVN) runs a Tourist Rest House (TRH) in Khirsu which is a stop-over for a day or two for tourists visiting Pauri.
 Chaukhamba View Point-It is located 4 km away from Pauri and overlooks the Idwal Valley and Chaukhamba Peak. It is situated in the dense forest of oak and rhododendron.
 Ransi Ground-It is located at a distance 2.5 km from the town. One of the highest points in Pauri, Ransi is a picnic spot. It has a Sports Stadium – the second highest stadium in Asia where games and tournaments are frequently organised. The stadium set amidst deodar trees.
 Kandolia Ground-Most of the local sports are organized in this ground.
 District Library-The library is open round the year for enthusiasts and houses a variety of books.
 Nagdev Evergreen Forest-Pleasant walk during the whole year.
 Laxman Temple-A rare temple dedicated to Lord Laxman which is considered over 1000 years old.
 Sita Mata Temple-The temple is around 15 km from the main town and is considered to be one of the only temples dedicated to Sita.
 Danda Nagraja Temple-Danda Nagaraja Temple is a temple of Lord Krishna in Pauri Garhwal, Uttrakhand. As per the beliefs, Lord Krishna crawled all the way top of this hill first time in snake form, where now the temple Danda Nagaraja is standing. This temple is also known for the views from there and it is around 34 km from the main city Pauri Garhwal bus station.
 Jwalpa Devi Temple-A temple dedicated to the Goddess Jwalpa. It is situated on the right bank of the Nawalika River (nayar),  from Pauri, on the main Pauri-Kotdwara road.
 Mahabgarh temple-A temple dedicated to Lord Shiva in Pauri Garhwal
 Pauri Viewpoint-  Main viewpoint of the city, it is located at the top left of the city, full view of city is visible from this viewpoint.

Media and communications
All India Radio has a local station in Pauri which transmits various programs of mass interest.

Notable people 

 General Bipin Rawat (1958–2021), India's 1st Chief of Defense Staff, last Chairman of the Chiefs of Staff Committee, 26th Chief of the Army Staff and 37th Vice Chief of the Army Staff.
 Lieutenant General Lakshman Singh Rawat - Former Deputy Chief of the Army Staff and father of General Bipin Rawat.

References

External links

 Pauri, Official website
 Pauri at wikimapia.

 
Cities and towns in Pauri Garhwal district